The R208 road is a regional road in Ireland linking the R280 and R202 roads in County Leitrim.

From the R280, the road goes east to Drumshanbo, crossing the Lough Allen Canal as it leaves Lough Allen.

See also
Roads in Ireland

References

Regional roads in the Republic of Ireland
Roads in County Leitrim